Pedro Antonio Vega Rodríguez (born 19 July 1979) is a Spanish former footballer who played as a left winger.

Club career
Vega was born in Vega de San Mateo, Las Palmas, Canary Islands. During his career he played mainly for UD Las Palmas and neighbouring Universidad de Las Palmas CF, who acted as the former's farm team for several years. He amassed Segunda División totals of 267 games and 47 goals over the course of 12 seasons, representing in the competition Las Palmas, Polideportivo Ejido and Levante UD; he scored a career-best at the professional level 11 goals in the 2004–05 and 2005–06 campaigns, helping the second club finish 13th and 15th respectively.

Vega retired in June 2013 at the age of nearly 34, after a third stint with Las Palmas which consisted of three official matches – two in the Copa del Rey– and 15 minutes of action in his last year.

References

External links

1979 births
Living people
People from Gran Canaria
Sportspeople from the Province of Las Palmas
Spanish footballers
Footballers from the Canary Islands
Association football wingers
Segunda División players
Segunda División B players
Tercera División players
UD Las Palmas Atlético players
UD Las Palmas players
Universidad de Las Palmas CF footballers
Granada CF footballers
Polideportivo Ejido footballers
Levante UD footballers
Spain youth international footballers